Bodi Turner (born 18 September 1994) is an Australian male BMX rider, representing his nation at international competition. He competed in the time trial event at the 2015 UCI BMX World Championships.

Turner was banned from competing by ASADA until 3 March 2019 for breaching Whereabouts rules. His Whereabouts violations were two missed tests and a filing failure in the period between November 2016 and August 2017.

References

External links
 
 
 
 
 

1994 births
Living people
BMX riders
Australian male cyclists
Olympic cyclists of Australia
Cyclists at the 2016 Summer Olympics
Sportspeople from Melbourne
Cyclists from Victoria (Australia)